Battell is a surname. Notable people with the surname include:

Carl Battell (1893–1988), Canadian ice hockey player
Edward Battell British racing cyclist, bronze medal winner at the 1896 Olympic Games
Joseph Battell (disambiguation), multiple people
Ralph Battell (1649–1713), English theologian

See also
the battell, part of the 1591 collection of keyboard pieces My Ladye Nevells Booke by William Byrd